Parliamentary elections were held in Kiribati on 12 March 1987, with a second round on 19 March. All candidates for the 39 seats ran as independents.

Electoral system
The number of seats was increased from 36 to 39, with additional seats given to Abaiang, Maiana and Nikunau due to population increases.

Results
Twenty of the elected MPs were new to Parliament. Sixteen incumbent MPs lost their seats, eight of which were affiliated with opposition leader Harry Tong and two of whom where ministers, Minister for Health and Family Planning Binata Tetaeka and Minister for Trade, Industry and Labour Teewe Arobati.

Aftermath
Following the elections Bereteitari Neeti was elected Speaker of the House of Assembly, defeating previous Speaker Matita Taniera by 20 votes to 19. MPs nominated Ieremia Tabai, Teatao Teannaki and Teburoro Tito to contest the May presidential elections; the result was a victory for Tabai, who received 50.1% of the vote.

References

Kiribati
1987 in Kiribati
Elections in Kiribati
Non-partisan elections
Election and referendum articles with incomplete results